Red Canary Song is an American grassroots coalition that advocates for the rights of Asian and migrant massage parlor workers. The coalition works to provide political representation, labor rights, collective organizing for migrant massage workers, and protection from violence by police and police impersonators across the United States and within the diaspora in Toronto, Paris, and Hong Kong.

History
Red Canary Song was founded in November 2018 by Kate Zen, Athena G., Red S., and Julie X. following the death of 38-year-old Flushing massage worker Yang Song on November 25, 2017 when she fell four stories to her death during a police raid. 

As of 2021, the group is currently based in Flushing, Queens and directed by Yin Q. and Esther Kao. Red Canary Song was created shortly after her death to support her family and fight for police accountability.  The coalition currently strives to address the hypersexualization and xenophobia that massage workers are likely to fall victim to, as made apparent by the 2021 Atlanta spa shootings. Red Canary Song advocates that shutting down massage businesses is not the proper means of ensuring massage workers a better quality of life. Rather, the solution lies in recognizing the rights and dignity of these workers. While Red Canary Song supports all migrant massage workers, the coalition does not wish to impose the assumption nor the identity of migrant sex workers upon anyone.

See also 
 2021 Atlanta spa shootings
 Xenophobia and racism related to the COVID-19 pandemic
 Page Act of 1875
 Asian fetish
 Sex positive feminism
 Anti-Chinese sentiment
 Stop Asian Hate

References

Non-profit organizations based in the United States